Blaine Saipaia  (born August 25, 1978) is a former American football offensive lineman. He was originally signed by the New Orleans Saints as an undrafted free agent in 2000. He played college football at Colorado State.

After retiring from the NFL, Saipaia became an assistant coach at Poudre High School in Fort Collins, Colorado. In 2017, he joined Canton McKinley High School in Canton, Ohio as freshman football coach. He later became a school resource assistant and by 2019 varsity head coach.

References

External links
Detroit Lions bio

1978 births
Living people
Sportspeople from Oxnard, California
American football offensive tackles
American football offensive guards
American football centers
American football tight ends
Colorado State Rams football players
New Orleans Saints players
Tennessee Titans players
Oakland Raiders players
Denver Broncos players
St. Louis Rams players
Detroit Lions players
American sportspeople of Samoan descent
Players of American football from San Diego
Sportspeople from Ventura County, California